Amanda Jane Platell (born 12 November 1957) is an Australian journalist. Between 1999 and 2001 she was the press secretary to William Hague, the then leader of the British Conservative Party. She is currently based in the UK.

Personal life
Platell was born in Perth, Western Australia. Her father was a journalist working for The West Australian newspaper and her mother was a secretary. Platell graduated with an Honours Degree in Politics and Philosophy from the University of Western Australia, her first job was in 1978 when she joined the Perth Daily News.

She has lamented that for medical reasons she has been unable to have children.

Early British career
After a backpacking tour of the world with her then fiancé John Chenery, she arrived in London in 1985. Aiming to earn enough money to return home she worked as a freelancer for publications including The Observer and the Sunday Express.

After being part of the start-up team of Today, she then joined Robert Maxwell's short-lived London Daily News, before returning under Today editor David Montgomery in 1987 as deputy editor. In 1993 she was appointed managing editor of the Mirror Group, and then moved in the same year to The Independent, initially as marketing director and then managing director.

In 1996 she joined the Sunday Mirror as acting editor, where she was the superior of Labour party's later director of communications, Alastair Campbell. In 1998 she was appointed acting editor of the Sunday Express, a position she was sacked from by Rosie Boycott following the publication of details of Peter Mandelson's gay relationship with his Brazilian partner.

In 1999, Platell published a novel Scandal, about women in the newspaper industry. "Two editors, one paper, may the best woman win" was how the cover summarised the plot.

It was from 1999 to 2001 that Platell moved into politics to become the Conservative Party's head of media, during which she supported William Hague, advising him to just "be yourself" as it was at these times he was his strongest. In her role, Platell made an important contribution to Hague's reversion from a modernising agenda to a 'core vote' strategy pursued during the 1999 European Elections, in which the Conservatives gained the most votes, as well as the 2001 General Election campaign. Hague, however, only managed to make a net gain of 1 seat in 2001, forcing his resignation shortly after the General Election.

Later media career

Since 2002, Platell has contributed as a freelancer to the Daily Mail.

On 21 November 2011, at the Leveson Inquiry into the culture, practice and ethics of the British press, Hugh Grant accused Platell of a "hatchet job" on his recent fatherhood following an article she wrote for the Daily Mail.

She has written articles calling for greater restrictions on Internet pornography.

Platell regularly reviewed the Sunday newspapers on The Andrew Marr Show.

In 2020 the Daily Mail paid damages of £25,000 to the Cambridge academic Professor Priyamvada Gopal and agreed to pay her legal costs after Platell libellously claimed, citing fake tweets, that she was "attempting to incite an aggressive and potentially violent race war".

Television
Unspin: Amanda Platell's Secret Video Diary – Channel 4 (2001)
Morgan & Platell – Channel 4 (2004–2005)
Prime Ministers Spouses – Channel 4 (2005)
Crisis Command: Could You Run The Country? – BBC Two (2004)
Bee in Your Bonnet – BBC Two (2004)
How Euro Are You? – BBC Two (2005)
Richard & Judy – Channel 4 (2001–07), regular commentator
The Daily Politics – BBC Two
Question Time – BBC One (1993, 2001, 2003, 2004, 2006, 2007, 2008, 2010, 2013 and 2014), panellist
The Apprentice: You're Fired! – BBC Two (2008, 2009, 2010), guest panellist
The Andrew Marr Show – BBC One (2005–), regular newspaper reviewer
The Alan Titchmarsh Show – ITV (2007–), occasional discussion contributor
This Morning – ITV (2009–), occasional newspaper reviewer
Dan Wootton Tonight – GB News (2021–), weekly panellist

References

External links 
"Amanda Platell: Nobody's fool" profile at BBC

1957 births
Australian expatriates in the United Kingdom
Australian journalists
British journalists
British newspaper editors
British public relations people
Living people
People from Perth, Western Australia
University of Western Australia alumni
Newspaper leader writers